Manuel Orantes Corral (born 6 February 1949) is a Spanish former professional tennis player. He won the US Open men's singles title in 1975, beating the defending champion Jimmy Connors in the final. Orantes reached a career-high singles ranking of world No. 2.

Career
On 7 September 1975 Orantes defeated top-seeded Jimmy Connors in the final of the US Open at Forest Hills, New York to win his only Grand Slam title. A year earlier, he was runner-up to Björn Borg in the final of the French Open, taking a two-set lead before Borg won the last three sets, losing just two games in total.

Overall, he won 36 singles titles, including Rome (1972), Hamburg (1972 & 1975), Canada (1975), Monte Carlo (1975), the U.S. Claycourt Championships (1973, 1975 & 1977), the U.S. Pro in Boston (1977 & 1978) and the Masters in 1976. He also reached 35 finals, including the French Open (1974), Cincinnati (1973), Monte Carlo (1970), Canada (1973 & 1974), Rome (1973 & 1975), and Hamburg (1976 & 1977).

Orantes was a stalwart member of the Spanish Davis Cup team from 1967 to 1980, earning a record of 60–27 in Davis Cup match play. He also was a member of the Spanish team which won the inaugural World Team Cup in 1978.

He also won 22 doubles titles in his career, including Hamburg in 1975 and Canada in 1974. He reached 20 doubles finals, including the French Open in 1978, Canada in 1976, and Hamburg in 1973.

Orantes was inducted into the International Tennis Hall of Fame in 2012.

Grand Slam finals

Singles (1 title, 1 runner-up)

Doubles (1 runner-up)

Other significant finals

Year-end championship

Singles: 1 (1 title)

Doubles (1 runner-up)

ATP Career finals

Singles: 74 (36 titles, 38 runner-ups)

Madrid 1968 and 1969 not listed by ATP.

Doubles: 42 (23 titles, 20 runner-ups)

Grand Slam singles performance timeline

References

External links

 
 
 
 

1949 births
Living people
Sportspeople from Granada
Spanish male tennis players
US Open (tennis) champions
Wimbledon junior champions
Grand Slam (tennis) champions in men's singles
Tennis players at the 1968 Summer Olympics
International Tennis Hall of Fame inductees
Mediterranean Games gold medalists for Spain
Mediterranean Games silver medalists for Spain
Competitors at the 1967 Mediterranean Games
Competitors at the 1971 Mediterranean Games
Mediterranean Games medalists in tennis
Grand Slam (tennis) champions in boys' singles
Tennis players from Andalusia